Laubertia, a genus of plants in the family Apocynaceae, was first described 1844. They are native to Mexico, Central America, and South America.

Species
 Laubertia boissieri A.DC.  - Venezuela, Colombia, Ecuador, Peru, Bolivia 
 Laubertia contorta (M.Martens & Galeotti) Woodson - Mexico from Chiapas north to Sinaloa and San Luis Potosí
 Laubertia peninsularis Woodson - Belize

References

Apocynaceae genera
Echiteae